Measures of Men is a 2023 German drama film directed by Lars Kraume. Starring Leonard Scheicher as an ethnologist, the film tells the story of a tragedy perpetrated in Africa by German colonial troops in the late 19th century. It is selected at the 73rd Berlin International Film Festival in Berlinale Special, where it had its world premiere on 22 February 2023. It is scheduled for release in cinemas on March 23, 2023.

Cast
  as Alexander Hoffmann
 Girley Charlene Jazama as Kezia Kambazembi
 Peter Simonischek as Josef Ritter von Waldstätten
 Ludger Bökelmann as Fähnrich Hartung
 Michael Del Coco as Leichenbeschauer
 Max Philip Koch as Korporal Kramer
 Leo Meier as Bernd Wendenburg
 Sven Schelker as Wolf von Crensky
 Paulus Anton as Friedrich Mahahero
 Petrus Jod as Pveclidias Witbooi

Production

Filming began on 30 August 2021. It was shot in Swakopmund, Namibia and Berlin. On 19 November 2021, the schedule was completed.

Release
Measures of Men had its  premiere on 22 February 2023 as part of the 73rd Berlin International Film Festival, in Berlinale Special. It is scheduled to release in cinemas on March 23, 2023.

Reception

Lida Bach of movie break rated the film 6.5 stars out of 10, praised the performances of Girley Charlene Jazama and Leonard Scheicher and found the production "solidly crafted". Concluding Bach wrote, "Lars Kraume's glossy history lesson reduplicates the racist objectification that it begins to criticize." Bach opined that "the focus was not on historical crimes but on the character case of a 'good colonialist' whose moral dilemma suggests ambivalence where there is none." She criticised  the fact that the genocide was used for pleasing entertainment, which said more about the colonialist mentality than the story.  Susanne Gottlieb reviewing for Cineuropa wrote that director Kraume showed, that the film was not the story of a hero, a man changed and willing to fight the status quo; rather it was the story of how certain horrors of the mid-20th century found a fertile breeding ground despite people’s conscience."

References

External links
 
 
 Measures of Men at Berlinale
 

2023 films
2023 drama films
2020s German-language films
2020s German films
German drama films
Films shot in Berlin
Films shot in Namibia